The Roșia Montană is a right tributary of the river Abrud in Romania. It discharges into the Abrud in Cărpiniș.

References

Rivers of Romania
Rivers of Alba County